Stay with Me Tonight is the second studio album by American singer Jeffrey Osborne. It was released on July 22, 1983 on A&M Records. Osborne reteamed with frequent collaborator George Duke to work on the album which reached #25 on the US Billboard 200 and #3 on the R&B chart. The title track, "Stay with Me Tonight", was a #4 R&B hit in 1983, while three other singles, "Don't You Get So Mad", "We're Going All the Way", and "Plane Love", entered the top twenty.

Critical reception

AllMusic editor Jason Elias found that songs "like "Other Side of the Coin," "When Are You Comin' Back," and "Two Wrongs Don't Make a Right" can't help but come off as filler given the excellent songs surrounding them. The best songs here more than make up for any so-so tracks and this is more than recommended."

Track listing
All tracks produced by George Duke.
"Don't You Get So Mad" (Don Freeman, Jeffrey Osborne, Michael Sembello) - 3:48
"We're Going All the Way" (Barry Mann, Cynthia Weil) - 4:15
"Stay with Me Tonight" (Raymond Jones) - 4:55
"Greatest Love Affair" (Jeffrey Osborne, Sam Dees) - 5:01
"Plane Love" (David "Hawk" Wolinski) - 4:00
"Other Side of the Coin" (Carlos Vega, Don Freeman, Jeffrey Osborne) - 3:38
"I'll Make Believe" (Geoffrey Leib, Jeffrey Osborne) - 5:04
"When Are You Comin' Back?" (Don Freeman, Jeffrey Osborne, Johnny McGhee) - 4:01
"Forever Mine" (George Duke, Jeffrey Osborne, Leon Ware) - 5:14
"Two Wrongs Don't Make a Right" (Geoffrey Leib, Jeffrey Osborne) - 4:39

Personnel 
Performers and Musicians

 Jeffrey Osborne – lead and backing vocals, rhythm arrangements, horn arrangements (1, 8), synthesizers (1), handclaps (3), electronic drums (9)
 George Duke – rhythm arrangements, horn arrangements (1, 8), E-mu Emulator (1), Prophet-5 (1, 2, 5, 9, 10), acoustic piano (2, 4, 7), electric piano (2, 7, 9), clavinet (6), Moog bass (9), electronic drums (9)
 Don Freeman – acoustic piano (1), electric piano (1), synthesizers (6, 8)
 Raymond Jones – electric piano (3), synthesizers (3)
 David "Hawk" Wolinski – synthesizers (5), electronic drums (5)
 Michael Sembello – guitar (1, 2, 4, 5), electric guitar (7)
 Paul Jackson Jr. – guitar (3, 6)
 Brian May – guitar solo (3, 10)
 Earl Klugh – acoustic guitar (7, 9)
 David Williams – rhythm guitar	(10)
 Henry Davis – bass (2)
 Alphonso Johnson – bass (3)
 Abraham Laboriel – bass (4, 7)
 Nathan Watts – bass (6)
 Louis Johnson – bass (10) 
 Steve Ferrone – drums (1, 2, 4, 6, 7, 8, 10), electronic drums (3)
 John Gilston – drum programming (3)
 Leon Ware – electronic drums (9)
 Paulinho da Costa – percussion (1, 3, 6, 8, 9, 10)
 Emil Richards – timpani (2)
 Larry Williams – tenor saxophone (1, 6), saxophone (8)
 Bill Reichenbach Jr. – trombone (1, 6)
 Gary Grant – trumpet (1, 6)
 Jerry Hey – trumpet (1, 6, 8), horn arrangements (2, 4-7, 9, 10)
 George Del Barrio – conductor (1, 4, 7), string arrangements (2)
 Lynn Davis – backing vocals (1, 3)
 Marcy Levy – backing vocals (2, 6, 10)
 Portia Griffin – backing vocals (5, 7)
 Josie James – backing vocals (9)
 Ronn David Jaxson - backing vocals (5)

Production and Technical
 Producer – George Duke
 Production Assistance – Cheryl R. Brown
 Engineer and Remix – Tommy Vicari
 Additional Engineers – Peter Chaiken and Erik Zobler
 Assistant Engineers – Barbara Rooney (Tracks 1, 4, 7, 8 & 10); Matt Forger (Tracks 1, 6 & 10); Steve Schmidt (Tracks 2, 3 & 6); Nick Spigel (Tracks 5, 6 & 9).
 Recorded at The Complex, Lion Share Recording, Westlake Audio, Ocean Way Recording and Record Plant (Los Angeles, CA); Le Gonks West and Soundcastle (Hollywood, CA).
 Mastered by Brian Gardner at Allen Zentz Mastering (Hollywood, CA).
 Art Direction – Chuck Beeson and Lynn Robb
 Design – Lynn Robb
 Photography – Lisa Powers

Charts

Weekly charts

Year-end charts

References

1983 albums
Jeffrey Osborne albums
A&M Records albums
Albums produced by George Duke